Mattias Hans Ekholm (born 24 May 1990) is a Swedish professional ice hockey defenceman for the Edmonton Oilers in the National Hockey League (NHL). He was drafted in the fourth round, 102nd overall, of the 2009 NHL Entry Draft by the Nashville Predators.

Playing career
While playing with Mora IK in Sweden, Ekholm was drafted in the fourth round, 102nd overall, by the Nashville Predators of the National Hockey League (NHL). Following the draft, he participated in Predators 2009 Development Camp. After recording a blazing start with 7 goals and 5 assists in his first 14 games with Brynäs, Ekholm was announced to be the first of four Elitserien Rookie of the Year candidates for the 2010–11 season. He would go on to win the award.

Nashville Predators
Following the 2010–11 season, Ekholm signed a three-year entry-level contract to play with the Predators for the 2011–12 season. After attending their training camp, Ekholm was named to the Predators opening night roster for his North America debut. However, Ekholm was a healthy scratch for the first five games of the 2011–12 season before making his debut in their home opener against the Phoenix Coyotes. He played two games with the Predators before returning to Brynäs for the remainder of the season. This was due to a predetermined deal Ekholm made with the Predators during the summer. Ekholm tallied one goal and one assists in his first six games back in Sweden. He continued to produce and won the Borje Salming Award as the top defenseman in the Swedish Elite League after talling eight goals and 16 points in 40 regular-season games.

Ekholm returned to the Predators for the 2012–13 season but was re-assigned to their American Hockey League (AHL) affiliate, the Milwaukee Admirals on 12 September 2012. By December, Ekholm was leading all Milwaukee defensemen in scoring with
four goals and seven assists for 11 points. Due to injuries, Ekholm earned an emergency recall to the NHL level on 15 April 2013. At the time, he had tallied 27 points through 55 games. He logged 16:05 minutes of ice time during a game against the Vancouver Canucks before being reassigned to the Admirals the following day. Ekholm ended the season with 32 points through 59 games.

In the second full year of his contract, Ekholm joined the Predators for the start of their 2013–14 season. He played on the Predators third line along with Seth Jones and Shea Weber. Ekholm scored his first NHL goal in a 3–2 win over the San Jose Sharks on 7 January 2014. He finished the season with nine points through 62 games and was one of six NHL defensemen to play at least 50 games and be assessed 10 or fewer penalty minutes. As such, Ekholm signed a two-year, $2.075 million contract with the Predators as a restricted free agent.

In the first year of his new contract, Ekholm changed his jersey number to 14 to match his World Championship number. Ekholm set career-highs in goals, assists, and points during the season with seven goals and 11 assists for 18 points.

Ekholm was named an alternate captain for the Predators on 19 September 2017, along with Ryan Johansen and Filip Forsberg.

On 11 February 2021, Ekholm was listed as week to week with an undisclosed injury following a game against the Tampa Bay Lightning.

On 13 October 2021, Ekholm signed a four-year, $25 million contract extension with the Predators with an annual average value of $6.25 million.

Edmonton Oilers
During the 2022–NHL season, on 28 February 2023, Ekholm and a 2023 sixth-round pick were traded to the Edmonton Oilers in exchange for a 2023 first-round draft pick, a 2024 fourth-round pick, defenceman Tyson Barrie and forward prospect Reid Schaefer.

Personal life
Ekholm is married to Ida Björnstad, a former sports broadcaster.

Career statistics

Regular season and playoffs

International

Awards and honours

References

External links
 

1990 births
Living people
Brynäs IF players
Edmonton Oilers players
Milwaukee Admirals players
Mora IK players
Nashville Predators draft picks
Nashville Predators players
People from Borlänge Municipality
Sportspeople from Dalarna County
Swedish expatriate ice hockey players in the United States
Swedish ice hockey defencemen